Persatuan Sepakbola Sampang (simply known as Persesa Sampang) is an Indonesian football club based in Sampang Regency, East Java. They currently compete in the Liga 3.

References

External links

Sport in East Java
Football clubs in Indonesia
Football clubs in East Java
Association football clubs established in 2001
2001 establishments in Indonesia